Jawahar Navodaya Vidyalaya, Patiala is a boarding, co-educational  school in Patiala district of Punjab, India. Navodaya Vidyalayas are funded by the Indian Ministry of Human Resources Development.

History 
The school was founded in 1989 and is a part of Jawahar Navodaya Vidyalayas.

Affiliations 
The school is affiliated to the Central Board of Secondary Education of India.

Geographic location 
JNV Patiala is situated near village Fatehpur Rajputan, Sanaur, Patiala District of Punjab.

References

External links 
 Navodaya Vidyalaya Samiti website

Jawahar Navodaya Vidyalayas in Punjab
Co-educational schools in India
Educational institutions established in 1989
1989 establishments in Punjab, India